"Bang This" is a pop-R&B song released by American-Australian urban artist J-Wess as the lead single from his debut album, J-Wess Presents Tha LP (2004). "Bang This" was written by J. Essex and A. Gardner and produced by J-Wess himself. "Bang this" features vocals from Kulaia and rapper Digga. The single was released in mid-2003 and began to garner airplays shortly after its release; the music video for "Bang this" also received plays on Australian video programs such as RAGE and Video Hits Australia. "Bang this" eventually debuted at number twenty-two on the Australian ARIA Singles Chart, and later reached a peak position of eighteen, becoming J-Wess' first top twenty single. Its success in Australia also led to it charting on the New Zealand RIANZ Singles Chart, where it reached  number thirty-nine.

Official versions
"Bang This (Album Version) – 3:34

Charts

References

2003 debut singles
2003 songs
Mushroom Records singles